Robert Lang (24 September 1934 – 6 November 2004) was an English actor.

Early life
Lang was born in Bristol, the son of Richard Lionel Lang and Lily Violet (née Ballard). He was educated at Fairfield Grammar School and St Simon’s Church School.

Career
His TV credits include Out of the Unknown ("Deathday", 1971), That Was The Week That Was, Thriller (1 episode, 1974), The New Avengers ("The Last of the Cybernauts?", 1976), 1990, Raffles - The Last Laugh (1977), Rumpole of the Bailey (1979), Tales of the Unexpected (1979), King Lear (1983), Confessional (1989), Under the Hammer (1994), Rasputin (1996), A Dance to the Music of Time (1997), The Forsyte Saga (2002), Our Mutual Friend (1998), and Heartbeat (2002). He also appeared in The Return of the Borrowers, as Mr Platter in 1993.

His films include Interlude (1968), Dance of Death (1969), A Walk with Love and Death (1969), The House That Dripped Blood (1970), Savage Messiah (1972), The Mackintosh Man (1973), Night Watch (1973), Shout at the Devil (1976), Rogue Male (1976), The Medusa Touch (1978), The First Great Train Robbery (1978), Runners (1983), Hawks (1988), Four Weddings and a Funeral (1994) and Wilde (1997). He played the Squire in Cider with Rosie (1998), and his final film appearance was as Mr Osbourne in Mrs. Palfrey at the Claremont (2005), screened a few months after his death from cancer in November 2004 at the age of 70.

Selected filmography

References

External links
 

1934 births
2004 deaths
Alumni of Bristol Old Vic Theatre School
Deaths from cancer in England
English male film actors
English male stage actors
English male television actors
People educated at Fairfield Grammar School
Male actors from Bristol